The Strathcona Hotel in downtown Toronto, Ontario, Canada opened in 1933. It has been used as a homeless shelter since 2020.

Hotel 
The Strathcona Hotel is 14-storey, 194-bedroom boutique hotel owned by the Silver Hotel Group. It is located across the street from the Fairmont Royal York hotel.

History 
The hotel opened in 1933. In 1935, the owner persistently pushed John Kidd, the municipal hotel inspector, to permit dancing in the dining room. Kidd rejected this, but encouraged his supervisory board to consider permitting dancing in hotels.

The hotel briefly appeared in the Suicide Squad 2016 movie.

In April 2020, the hotel was rented by the City of Toronto for six months to provide temporary shelter for people experiencing homelessness. In October 2020, the lease was extended by another six months. The city paid the hotel $592,243 per month, representing $100 per room per night, totalling $7.5 million per year, plus the cost of providing food to residents. In December 2022, a former resident of the hotel was fatally stabbed outside of it.

References

External links 
 Strathcona Hotel - official website
 Silver Hotel Group - official website
 Hotel photo - flickr

Hotels in Toronto
1933 establishments in Ontario
Hotels established in 1933
Homeless shelters in Canada